When the Sea Rises is a 2004 French-Belgian romantic comedy film directed by Yolande Moreau and Gilles Porte. It was Moreau's directorial debut.

Plot
Irène is an actress who performs her one-person show all over northern France. One day she is heading for a new town when her car breaks down. On the countryside she is picked up by a travelling stranger who rides a Scooter. He introduces himself as Dries and gives her a lift. She rewards him with a ticket for her show. When he arrives there she involves him in her performance. The next evening he returns and feels he must protect her against perturbators in the audience. She doesn't appreciate the way he tries to take care of this matter. They have a considerable dispute which eventually ends in a reconciliation. This marks the beginning of a love affair.

Cast

 Yolande Moreau as Irène
 Wim Willaert as Dries
 Olivier Gourmet as The cop
 Jackie Berroyer as Béthune
 Philippe Duquesne as Café's owner
 Jacques Bonnaffé as The server
 Séverine Caneele as The maid
 Bouli Lanners as The market's owner
 Jan Hammenecker as Jan
 Vincent Mahieu as Yves
 Nand Buyl as Dries's father
 Emmy Leemans as Dries's mother
 Jean-François Picotin as Fifi
 François Morel as TV Host

Critical reception
The film received critical acclaim. Review aggregator Rotten Tomatoes reports that 90% of 20 critics gave the film a positive review, for an average rating of 6.5 out of 10. Metacritic gave the film a score of 62 out of 100, based on eight critics.

Background
The film title is an homage to the French folk singer Raoul de Godewaersvelde whose song "Quand la mer monte" is a re-occurring theme throughout the film.

Awards 
César Award for Best Debut (Yolande Moreau and Gilles Porte)
 César Award for Best Actress (Yolande Moreau)
 Louis Delluc Prize for Best First Film

See also

 Cinema of France
 Cinema of Belgium
 List of French language films

References

External links
 
 

  

2004 films
2004 romantic comedy films
French romantic comedy films
Films about actors
César Award winners
Films set in France
Louis Delluc Prize winners
Best First Feature Film César Award winners
2004 directorial debut films
Films featuring a Best Actress César Award-winning performance
2000s French-language films
2000s French films